Erich Erdös was an Austrian figure skater who competed in men's singles.

He won the bronze medal in men's single skating at the 1934 World Figure Skating Championships.

Competitive highlights

References 

Austrian male single skaters
Date of birth missing
Date of death missing